Alan O'Connor (born 2 June 1985) is an Irish Gaelic footballer. His league and championship career with the Cork senior team spanned ten seasons from 2008 to 2017.

Born in Lucan, Dublin, O'Connor arrived on the inter-county scene at the age of seventeen when he first linked up with the Cork minor team, before later joining the under-21 and junior sides. He made his senior debut in the 2008 championship. O'Connor went on to play a key role on the team for five years, and won one All-Ireland medal, three Munster medals and three National Football League medals. He was an All-Ireland runner-up on one occasion.

O'Connor represented the Munster inter-provincial team on a number of occasions throughout his career, winning one Railway Cup medal. At club level he won one championship medal with divisional side Carbery while also playing for St Colum's.

O'Connor announced his retirement from inter-county football on 18 November 2013. He returned to the panel in May 2015.

Career statistics

Honours

St Colum's
Cork Junior B Hurling Championship (1): 2003
West Cork Junior Football Championship (1): 2003

Carbery
Cork Senior Football Championship (1): 2004

Cork
All-Ireland Senior Football Championship (1): 2010
Munster Senior Football Championship (3): 2008, 2009, 2012
National Football League (Division 1) (3): 2010, 2011, 2012
National Football League (Division 2) (1): 2009
All-Ireland Junior Football Championship (2): 2005, 2007
Munster Junior Football Championship (2): 2005, 2007
Munster Under-21 Football Championship (2): 2004, 2005, 2006

Munster
Railway Cup (1): 2008

References

1985 births
Living people
St Colum's Gaelic footballers
Carbery Gaelic footballers
Cork inter-county Gaelic footballers
St Colum's hurlers
Munster inter-provincial Gaelic footballers
Winners of one All-Ireland medal (Gaelic football)
Lucan Sarsfields Gaelic footballers
Carbery hurlers
Dual players
Irish electricians